Gino's Pizza and Spaghetti is a restaurant chain with 40 locations, most of them within the U.S. state of West Virginia. The company was founded by Kenney Grant in 1961. Many locations are shared with Tudor's Biscuit World although the Gino's brand is exclusive to West Virginia. There is one located in Ohio, while there are stand alone Tudor's locations in eastern Kentucky, southern Ohio, southwest Virginia and the Florida Panhandle. The company headquarters are located in Huntington, West Virginia and Nitro, West Virginia.

The original location was located on 29th Street in Huntington, but is no longer there.  The oldest location is Gino's Pub in Huntington, West Virginia, located on 5th Avenue across the street from the Veterans Memorial Soccer Complex. This location features the original scoreboard from Fairfield Stadium. The scoreboard features the score of Marshall University's most recent football game in-season, and that of the 1971 Marshall - Xavier University (of Cincinnati) as featured in the motion picture We Are Marshall during the offseason.

See also
 List of pizza chains of the United States

References

External links
Corporate Site

Companies based in West Virginia
Pizza chains of the United States
Regional restaurant chains in the United States
Restaurants in West Virginia
Italian-American culture in West Virginia
1961 establishments in West Virginia
Restaurants established in 1961